To Have and Have Not is a novel by Ernest Hemingway published in 1937 by Charles Scribner's Sons. The book follows Harry Morgan, a fishing boat captain out of Key West, Florida. To Have and Have Not was Hemingway's second novel set in the United States, after The Torrents of Spring.

Written sporadically between 1935 and 1937, and revised as he traveled back and forth from Spain during the Spanish Civil War, the novel portrays Key West and Cuba in the 1930s, and provides a social commentary on that time and place. Hemingway biographer Jeffrey Meyers described the novel as heavily influenced by the Marxist ideology Hemingway was exposed to by his support of the Republican faction in the Spanish Civil War while he was writing it. The work got a mixed critical reception.

The novel had its origins in two short stories published earlier in periodicals by Hemingway ("One Trip Across" and "The Tradesman's Return") which make up the opening chapters, and a novella, written later, which makes up about two-thirds of the book. The narrative is told from multiple viewpoints, at different times, by different characters, and the characters' names are frequently supplied under the chapter headings to indicate who is narrating that chapter.

Summary
Hemingway depicts Harry as an ordinary working man of the Depression Era, forced by dire economic forces into the black-market activity of running contraband between Cuba and Florida. A wealthy fishing charter customer (one of the "Have's") bilks Harry by slipping away without paying after a three-week fishing trip, leaving Harry destitute.  Stuck in Havana and motivated by the need to support his family, Harry then himself turns to crime.  He makes a fateful decision to swindle would-be Chinese immigrants seeking passage into Florida from Cuba. Instead of transporting them as agreed, he murders the Chinese middle-man and puts the men ashore in Cuba. Harry begins to ferry different types of illegal cargo between the two countries, including alcohol and Cuban revolutionaries. These events alternate with chapters that describe the dissolute lives of wealthy yacht owners. The Great Depression features prominently in the novel, forcing depravity and hunger on the poor residents of Key West (the "Have Not's") who are referred to locally as "Conchs".

Background and publication history
To Have and Have Not began as a short story—published as "One Trip Across" in Cosmopolitan in 1934—introducing the character of Harry Morgan. A second story was written and published in Esquire in 1936, at which point Hemingway decided to write a novel about Harry Morgan. However, the outbreak of the Spanish Civil War delayed his work on it.

To Have and Have Not was published by Scribner's on 15 October 1937 to a first edition print-run of approximately 10,000 copies. Cosmopolitan published a section of the novel as "One Trip Across" in 1934; Esquire published a section as "The Tradesman's Return" in 1936.  It was also published as an Armed Services Edition during WWII.

Film adaptations 

The novel was adapted into a 1944 film starring Humphrey Bogart and Lauren Bacall. The film, directed by Howard Hawks, changed the story's setting from Key West to Martinique under the Vichy regime, and made significant alterations to the plot, including removing themes involving economic inequality and class conflict, and turning the story into a romantic thriller centering on the sparks going on between Harry Morgan and Marie Browning.

The second film version, titled The Breaking Point (1950), was directed by Michael Curtiz and stars John Garfield and Patricia Neal with Juano Hernandez as Morgan's partner. The movie shifted the action to southern California and made Garfield a former PT Boat captain but is otherwise the most faithful to the original book.

The third film version, titled The Gun Runners (1958), was directed by Don Siegel and stars Audie Murphy in the Bogart/Garfield role and Everett Sloane in Walter Brennan's part as the alcoholic sidekick, although Sloane's interpretation was less overtly comedic than Brennan's. The movie features a bravura performance by Eddie Albert as a charismatic villain. Pauline Kael and Bosley Crowther have claimed that the ending was used for John Huston's film Key Largo (1948); Kael also said that "One Trip Across" was made into The Gun Runners (1958).

In 1987 the Iranian director Nasser Taghvai adapted the novel into a nationalized version called Captain Khorshid which took the events from Cuba to the shores of the Persian Gulf.

Season 1 episode 12 ("Fury at Rio Hondo") of the television show Cheyenne is a shorter version of the same story set in Mexico in the Old West, with a screenplay by William Faulkner and James Gunn.

Citations

General references

External links
 Hemingway Archives, John F. Kennedy Library

1937 American novels
American crime novels
American novels adapted into films
American novels adapted into television shows
Books by Ernest Hemingway
Charles Scribner's Sons books
Novels by Ernest Hemingway
Novels set in Havana
Novels set in Florida